Phyllonorycter acratynta is a moth of the family Gracillariidae. It is known from Indian state of Tamil Nadu.

References

acratynta
Moths of Asia
Moths described in 1916